Yaneh Sar District is a district (bakhsh) in Behshahr County, Mazandaran Province, Iran. At the 2006 census, its population was 10,625, in 2,829 families.  The District has no cities.  The District has two rural districts (dehestan): Ashrestaq Rural District and Shohada Rural District.

References 

Behshahr County
Districts of Mazandaran Province